The Sheriff of Fractured Jaw is a 1958 British-American Western comedy directed by Raoul Walsh, starring Kenneth More and Jayne Mansfield. Mansfield's singing voice is dubbed by Connie Francis. It was one of the first Westerns to be shot in Spain.

Plot summary
Jonathon Tibbs (Kenneth More), son of a family of English gunsmiths, has no interest in the business and prefers inventing gadgets, in particular a steam-powered horseless carriage. Threatened with disinheritance if he does not report for work, he discovers that the company is not doing very well, and concludes that someone must expand their sales.

He reads in his newspaper about the wide use of guns in the American West of the 1880s, and decides to go there himself to sell firearms to the locals.

He ends up at the small lawless town of Fractured Jaw and inadvertently acquires a reputation for quickness on the draw, due to his wrist-mounted Derringer style weapon. He is innocently drawn into a range war between the "Box T" and "Lazy S" cattle outfits, both of whom claim sole water rights and, when he proves able to stand up to their hired gunmen, is appointed sheriff.

He endeavours to clean up the town using what skills he has, and by multilateral diplomacy. He attracts the support of Miss Kate (Jayne Mansfield), a blonde bombshell hotel owner, who helps him to fight off the hired guns of both cattle ranches, who all want him dead.

Earning the respect of the local Indian tribe, he becomes a blood brother of theirs, under the name of 'Fleet Iron Hat'. When he and Kate are besieged by the gunmen of both outfits, they come to his rescue and help to arrest the men. The two ranch owners eventually offer a deal to maintain the peace and share the water rights.

With relative peace restored, Jonathon decides to remain in Fractured Jaw, becomes an American citizen and marries Kate.

Cast
 Kenneth More as Jonathan Tibbs
 Jayne Mansfield as Kate
 Henry Hull as Major Masters
 Bruce Cabot as Jack
 Ronald Squire as Toynbee, Uncle Lucius' Solicitor
 William Campbell as Keeno
 Sid James as The Drunk
 Reed De Rouen as Clayborne
 Charles Irwin as Luke
 Donald Stewart as The Drummer
 Clancy Cooper as The Barber
 Gordon Tanner as Bud Wilkins
 Robert Morley as Uncle Lucius
 David Horne as James, Uncle Lucius' Butler
 Eynon Evans as Manager of Tibbs & Co.
 Chief Jonas Applegarth as Running Deer
 Deputy Chief Joe Buffalo as Red Wolf
 Larry Taylor as Gun Guard

Production
The film was based on a short story by Jacob Hays published in the Canadian magazine Maclean's in June 1954. Prior to publication, the film rights were bought by 20th Century Fox in 1954 as a possible vehicle for Clifton Webb and Marilyn Monroe. That film was never made.

In March 1957 English producer Daniel Angel signed a deal with Fox to make at least three films in England. The first one would be Sheriff of Fractured Jaw to star Kenneth More. More had become popular in films such as Genevieve (1953) and The Admirable Crichton (1957). More, who had co-starred with American Betsy Drake in his previous movie, said "I feel like I'm taking first steps towards Hollywood".

Walsh's first and only choice for the part of Kate, a saloon owner and singer, was blonde bombshell Jayne Mansfield. Mansfield had been discovered playing in the Broadway comedy Will Success Spoil Rock Hunter? in 1955, and she was signed to an exclusive contract with Fox in 1956 at a $2500-a-week salary. The studio intended to mold her as a successor to the temperamental Marilyn Monroe, and cast her in Monroe-type roles in The Girl Can't Help It (1956) and a 1957 film adaptation of her Broadway triumph. Walsh felt Mansfield offered the precise mixture of humor and sexuality to bring the character to life, and she was signed on the film in early 1958, not long after marrying her second husband, muscleman Mickey Hargitay.

Shooting
The Sheriff of Fractured Jaw started filming at Pinewood Studios in England, shooting the interiors and the prologue, which is set in London. The studio's massive inventory of sets, carriages, and period props made setting the film in the mid-1800s American West easily possible.

Angel said "Kenneth More and Jayne Mansfield were a good team." 

Then, the production moved to a remote location in the Spanish province of Aragon, the first time a Western film was made in the country. According to Variety the Spanish section of the film only cost $200,000 including a Western village and Indian camp built twenty miles from Madrid.

Walsh called on several actors he had previously worked with to fill out the cast: Henry Hull and Bruce Cabot.

During production, Mansfield became pregnant with her second child and often missed filming days, delaying production, and upsetting Fox executives. The film was completed on time and on budget, however. It was released in the United Kingdom in December 1958, but it was not released in the United States until March 14, 1959.

It was the first of a three picture deal between More and Angel and 20th. More earned 5% of the profits.

Reception
The Sheriff of Fractured Jaw received mixed reviews at the time of its release. It was considerably better received, both critically and financially, in England than in America. American critics gave negative reviews to Mansfield's musical performances in the film, claiming her voice was noticeably dubbed. In fact, her voice was dubbed by singer-actress Connie Francis.

Variety said it was "not to be missed" adding "Who ever greenlighted the starring combo of Jayne Mansfield and Kenneth More in “The Sheriff of Fractured Jaw” has done themselves and filmgoers a good turn. These two effervescent personalities merge like bacon and eggs, and the result is a wave of yocks."

Box office
The film was the tenth most-popular movie at the British box office in 1958. According to Kinematograph Weekly the film performed "better than average" at the British box office in 1959. "It'll be a gold mine for us," said More, who had a percentage of the profits.

It made $1,924,875 in American theaters and $2,485,125 elsewhere.

More and Angel were meant to follow it with Have Monocle Will Travel based on the adventures of an ex-British colonel but the film was not made.

See also
 Spaghetti Western

References

External links
 
 
 
 
 
 

1958 films
1950s English-language films
1950s Western (genre) comedy films
1950s historical comedy films
CinemaScope films
British Western (genre) comedy films
British historical comedy films
Films directed by Raoul Walsh
Films shot at Pinewood Studios
20th Century Fox films
Steampunk films
Films shot in Spain
Films shot in Madrid
Films based on short fiction
1958 comedy films
1950s British films